Flynn Southam (born 5 June 2005) is an Australian swimmer. At the 2022 Junior Pan Pacific Championships, he won gold medals in the 50 metre freestyle, 100 metre freestyle, and 200 metre freestyle. In the 4×100 metre freestyle relay, he won a gold medal at the 2022 Commonwealth Games as well as silver medals at the 2022 Junior Pan Pacific Championships and the 2022 World Short Course Championships, swimming on the finals relay at each competition. In the 4×200 metre freestyle relay, he won gold medals as a finals relay member at the 2022 Commonwealth Games and 2022 Junior Pan Pacific Championships, and a silver medal at the 2022 World Short Course Championships.

Background
Southam was born 5 June 2005 in Australia. He trains at Bond University in Gold Coast, Queensland under the guidance of head coach Chris Mooney.

Career

2022

2022 Australian Swimming Championships
At the 2022 Australian Swimming Championships, held in Adelaide in May, Southam qualified for the 2022 Commonwealth Games in the 4×100 metre freestyle relay, based on his time of 48.76 and third-place finish in the 100 metre freestyle, and the 4×200 metre freestyle relay, based on his fourth-place finish in the 200 metre freestyle with a time of 1:46.82.

2022 Commonwealth Games
On day one of swimming competition at the 2022 Commonwealth Games, conducted at Sandwell Aquatics Centre in Birmingham, England starting in July, Southam won a gold medal in the 4×100 metre mixed freestyle relay, contributing a split of 49.21 for the first leg of the preliminaries before being substituted out for William Yang in the final. The following day, he won a second gold medal, this time leading off the 4×100 metre freestyle relay in the final with a time of 48.54 seconds to help achieve a new Games record time of 3:11.12 with finals relay teammates Zac Incerti, William Yang, and Kyle Chalmers. Two days later, he went three for three in his relay events, helping win the gold medal in the 4×200 metre freestyle relay in a Games record time of 7:04.96 by contributing a split of 1:46.08 for the second leg of the relay in the final. In his final event, the 50 metre freestyle, he placed tenth in the semifinals with a time of 22.60 seconds.

2022 Junior Pan Pacific Championships

For the 2022 Junior Pan Pacific Swimming Championships, held at Veterans Memorial Aquatic Center in August in Honolulu, United States, Southam won the gold medal in the 200 metre freestyle with a Championships record of 1:47.11, breaking former record of 1:47.65 set by Drew Kibler in 2018. The following day, he won the gold medal in the 100 metre freestyle with a Championships record time of 48.23 seconds, lowering the former mark of 48.91 established by Jack Cartwright in 2016, and finishing over one full second ahead of silver medalist Thomas Heilman of the United States. Later in the finals session, he helped win the gold medal in the 4×200 metre freestyle relay in a Championships record time of 7:13.07, leading off the relay with a time of 1:47.30. On the third day, he helped win the silver medal in the 4×100 metre freestyle relay in a final time of 3:18.06, leading-off the relay with a 48.43.

Starting off the fourth and final day, Southam ranked third in the preliminaries of the 50 metre freestyle with a time of 22.75 seconds and qualified for the final. For his first event of the evening finals session, he won the gold medal in the 50 metre freestyle, finishing in a time of 22.36 seconds, which was 0.14 seconds ahead of the two Americans who tied for the silver medal. Concluding the Championships, he helped win the silver medal in the 4×100 metre medley relay, splitting a 47.87 for the freestyle leg of the relay to contribute to the final mark of 3:36.96. Across his individual events, he earned a total of 27 points for his placings, ranking as the second highest scoring male swimmer, only one point behind fellow Australian Joshua Staples.

2022 World Short Course Championships

Southam was named to the Team Australia roster in early September for the 2022 World Short Course Championships in Melbourne, which was a little over two months before the start of competition. On the first day of competition, 13 December, he contributed a split time of 46.55 seconds for the second leg of the 4×100 metre freestyle relay in the preliminaries to help qualify the relay to the final ranking fourth with a time of 3:07.02. In the evening final, he helped win the silver medal in an Oceanian, Commonwealth and Australian record time of 3:04.63, leading-off the relay with a personal best time of 47.04. The third morning, he swam the third leg of the 4×50 metre freestyle relay in the preliminaries in 21.08 seconds, which contributed to a time of 1:24.42 that qualified the relay to the final ranking fifth. For the final, he swam a 21.10 for the third leg, helping set new Oceanian, Commonwealth, Australian, and Australian All Comers records of 1:23.44 and win the gold medal.

Leading-off the 4×50 metre mixed freestyle relay in the morning preliminaries on day four with a 22.04, Southam helped qualify the relay to the final ranking second in 1:29.82. Later in the same preliminaries session, he split a 1:42.20 for the second leg of the 4×200 metre freestyle relay to help advance the relay to the final ranked fourth with a time of 6:54.83. On the finals 4×50 metre mixed freestyle relay, Kyle Chalmers substituted in for him and he won a silver medal for his efforts when the relay placed second in 1:28.03. In his second event of the evening, he split a 1:41.50 for the third leg of the 4×200 metre freestyle relay to help win the silver medal in an Oceanian, Commonwealth, and Australian record time of 6:46.54. The fifth morning, he helped advance the 4×50 metre medley relay to the final ranking seventh with a time of 1:33.25, swimming a 21.28 for the freestyle leg of the relay. He won a bronze medal in the event when the finals relay placed third in a time of 1:30.81.

International championships (50 m)

 Southam swam only in the prelims heats.

International championships (25 m)

 Southam swam only in the prelims heats.

Personal best times

Long course metres (50 m pool)

Short course metres (50 m pool)

Legend: r – relay 1st leg

Continental and national records

Short course metres (25 m pool)

References

External links
 
 
 

2005 births
Living people
Australian male freestyle swimmers
Commonwealth Games competitors for Australia
Commonwealth Games medallists in swimming
Commonwealth Games gold medallists for Australia
Swimmers at the 2022 Commonwealth Games
Medalists at the FINA World Swimming Championships (25 m)
Sportsmen from Western Australia
21st-century Australian people
Medallists at the 2022 Commonwealth Games